Siegfried Landau (September 4, 1921February 20, 2007) was a German-born American conductor and composer.

He was born in Berlin, the son of Ezekiel Landau, an Orthodox rabbi, and Helen (Grynberg) Landau.  He was a music student at the Stern and Klindworth-Scharwenka Conservatories in Germany.  His family emigrated to London in 1939.  In 1940, Landau came to New York City and was a pupil of Pierre Monteux.  In 1943, he became a faculty member of the New York College of Music (after 1968 absorbed into New York University's Steinhardt School of Culture, Education and Human Development).

Landau joined the Brooklyn Philharmonic (then called the Brooklyn Philharmonia) in 1955, an orchestra comprised at that time of freelance musicians in the New York City area with a focus on contemporary or infrequently performed classical music.  His tenure as the orchestra's music director was from 1955 to 1971, when he resigned after the orchestra had reduced its season and programming opportunities during a period of financial difficulty.  From 1961 to 1981, he was the conductor of the Music for Westchester Symphony (later the White Plains Symphony), until he left the orchestra over disputes with the board of directors regarding programming.  He led the Chattanooga Opera Association from 1960 to 1973.  In Europe, he was Generalmusikdirektor of the Westphalian Symphony Orchestra from 1973 to 1975.

Landau's compositions included music for a dance drama, The Dybbuk, by Anna Sokolow.  Landau was also a teacher at the Jewish Theological Seminary and the music director for Shearith Israel Synagogue, Manhattan.

Landau married Irene Gabriel in 1954, and they had two sons, Robert and Peter.  Landau often conducted the music for Gabriel's dance company in the 1950s and 1960s.  Landau and Gabriel moved into their Brushton home in upstate New York in the 1980s.  They died in a fire which destroyed the residence.  Their sons survived them.

References

External links
 Brooklyn Philharmonic: Kirshbaum Demler & Assoc

1921 births
2007 deaths
New York College of Music faculty
New York University faculty
American male conductors (music)
Jewish emigrants from Nazi Germany to the United States
Musicians from Berlin
Musicians from New York City
People from Westchester County, New York
Accidental deaths in New York (state)
People from Moira, New York
Klindworth-Scharwenka Conservatory alumni
Deaths from fire in the United States
Classical musicians from New York (state)
20th-century American conductors (music)
20th-century American male musicians